Lake Amador is a reservoir located in Amador County, California. It lies at an elevation of 325 feet.

Its crest is  about sea level, and it belongs to the Jackson Valley Irrigation District.

See also
 List of lakes in California
 List of reservoirs and dams in California

References

Amador, Lake
Amador
Dams completed in 1965
1965 establishments in California